Bernd Gorski (born 4 October 1959) is a German former football player and manager.

Career
As a player, Gorski spent three seasons in the Bundesliga with Hamburger SV and Eintracht Braunschweig, as well as ten seasons in the 2. Bundesliga with Braunschweig and Hannover 96.

After retiring from professional football in 1991, he was a manager at the semi-pro and amateur level.

Personal life
Gorski is the son-in-law of football manager Gerd Roggensack.

Honours
Hamburger SV
 Bundesliga: 1978–79

References

External links

1959 births
Living people
Footballers from Hamburg
Association football defenders
German footballers
Association football midfielders
Germany youth international footballers
Germany under-21 international footballers
SC Paderborn 07 players
Eintracht Braunschweig players
Hannover 96 players
Hamburger SV players
Bundesliga players
2. Bundesliga players
German football managers
SC Paderborn 07 managers